Starship HLS, or Starship Human Landing System, is a lunar lander variant of the Starship spacecraft  that will transfer astronauts from a lunar orbit to the surface of the Moon and back. It is being designed and built by SpaceX under contract to NASA as a critical element of NASA's Artemis program to land a crew on the Moon in the 2020s.

The mission plan calls for a Super Heavy booster to launch a Starship HLS into an Earth orbit, where it will be refueled by multiple Starship tanker spacecraft before boosting itself into a lunar near-rectilinear halo orbit (NRHO). There, it will rendezvous with a crewed Orion spacecraft that will be launched from Earth by a NASA Space Launch System (SLS) launcher. A crew of two astronauts will transfer from Orion to HLS, which will then descend to the lunar surface for a stay of approximately 7 days which is to include five or more EVAs. It will then return the crew to Orion in NRHO.

In the third phase of its HLS procurement process NASA awarded SpaceX a contract in April 2021 to develop, produce, and demonstrate Starship HLS. A crewed flight will occur as part of the Artemis 3 mission, no earlier than April 2025, after an earlier uncrewed test flight successfully lands on the Moon and returns to NRHO.

On 23 March 2022, NASA announced its intention to procure a second crewed Starship HLS demonstration mission to the Moon, with the HLS design updated to meet new sustainability requirements. NASA intends to negotiate a sole-source award to SpaceX by exercising an option under the 2021 HLS contract. The updated Starship HLS would be used for the Artemis V mission and would compete with landers to be procured from other vendors for later landings.

Design 
Starship HLS is a variant of SpaceX's Starship spacecraft optimized to operate on and around the Moon. In contrast to the Starship spacecraft from which it derives, Starship HLS will never reenter an atmosphere, so it does not have a heat shield or flight control surfaces. In contrast to other HLS designs that proposed multiple stages, the entire spacecraft will land on the Moon and will then launch from the Moon. Like other Starship variants, Starship HLS has six Raptor engines mounted at the tail which are used when the Starship HLS acts as the second stage during the launch from Earth. They are also used as its primary propulsion system in all other flight phases. Within 100 meters of the lunar surface, the variant will utilize high‑thrust RCS thrusters located mid‑body to avoid plume impingement problems with the lunar regolith. The thrusters burn gaseous oxygen and methane instead of the liquid oxygen and methane used by the Raptors. However, these thrusters may not be needed. Starship HLS is supplied with electrical power by a band of solar panels around the circumference of the vehicle.

Starship HLS requires in-orbit propellant transfer in its mission profile. Prior to the launch of the HLS vehicle from Earth, a Starship variant configured as a propellant depot would be launched into an Earth orbit and then partially or fully filled by between four and fourteen Starship tanker flights carrying propellant. The Starship HLS vehicle would then launch and rendezvous with the already-loaded propellant depot and refuel before transiting from Earth orbit to Lunar orbit.

Starship HLS incorporates the following design characteristics:
 approximately 24 midbody oxygen-methane thrusters for use very near the lunar surface
 100-day loiter capability in lunar orbit
 lunar downmass of more than 100 t, far exceeding NASA requirement of less than 2 t.
 lunar upmass of more than 100 t, far exceeding NASA requirement of less than 1 t.
 support for a greater number of EVAs on the lunar surface than the minimum required by NASA in the 2020 solicitation
 excess-propellant margin can be applied to expedite an emergency ascent from the Moon

Within the Artemis lunar landing architecture , a NASA Orion spacecraft is planned to be launched by a Space Launch System rocket and rendezvous with a waiting Starship HLS lander in a near-rectilinear halo orbit around the Moon. The crew of Orion would then dock with, and transfer to Starship HLS, which would subsequently depart and descend to the lunar surface. After lunar surface operations, Starship HLS will lift-off from the Moon and return to lunar orbit to rendezvous with Orion. The crew then transfers back to Orion and departs for Earth. Although not confirmed yet, Starship HLS could, in theory, be refueled in orbit to carry more crews and cargo to the surface.

History 
Starship HLS builds on the SpaceX Starship system by adding a new spacecraft variant called Starship HLS. This spacecraft will be used in conjunction with the Starship booster (called Super Heavy) and two additional Starship spacecraft variants, "tanker" and "depot", that were already being planned prior to the HLS contract.

Starship system history

The SpaceX Starship concept was initially conceived in the early 2010s as a spacecraft that would be principally built for the Mars colonization effort that SpaceX CEO Elon Musk has advocated since 2011, with the first colonists arriving no earlier than the middle of the 2020s.

By 2016, the scope became somewhat broader, when Musk realized the high-level design SpaceX had been working on for the Starship vehicle allowed for variants that would be suitable for interplanetary travel more generally, and could work both on planets with and without an atmosphere. Lunar destination flights, however, were not generally emphasized by Musk, and he specifically stated that the Moon was not a necessary step on the path to Mars.

By late 2018, SpaceX had specified the primary construction material for Starship to be stainless steel – after approximately a year of building manufacturing pathfinder hardware out of carbon composite materials—and manufacture of the initial test article including pressure vessel construction for the liquid methane and liquid oxygen tanks began in early 2019.

Between July 2019 and July 2021, seven Starship prototype vehicles, each with different vehicle design configurations and varied test objectives, flew a total of eight atmospheric test flights, all launched from the SpaceX South Texas launch site at Boca Chica, Texas.

Starship HLS history

Initial "Option A" Contract 
Starship itself has been in privately-funded development by SpaceX since the mid-2010s, but the HLS (Human Landing System) variant is being developed under contracts with the United States' National Aeronautics and Space Administration (NASA). The initial contracted design work started in May 2020, with selection and funding for full-development occurring in April 2021, when Starship HLS was selected by NASA to land "the first woman and the next man" on the Moon during the Artemis 3 mission, potentially as early as 2024.

NASA signed a  contract with SpaceX to develop and manufacture Starship HLS, and to conduct two flights an uncrewed demonstration mission, and a crewed lunar landing. Starship HLS is intended to dock in a lunar NRHO with either the NASA Orion spacecraft or NASA lunar Gateway space station, in order to take on passengers before descending to the lunar surface and return them after ascent. NASA is conducting a competitive procurement process for HLS systems for later Artemis missions, and Starship HLS will be a contender.

Starship HLS, with HLS being an initialism for Human Landing System, was first made public when it was initially selected by the NASA in April 2020 for a design study as part of their Artemis program, which aims to land humans on the Moon. SpaceX was one of three teams selected to develop competing lunar lander designs for the Artemis program over a year-long period starting in May 2020. The other landers in consideration were Dynetics HLS, developed by aerospace manufacturer Dynetics, and the Integrated Lander Vehicle, developed by a team led by Blue Origin. NASA intended to later select and fund at most two of these landers to continue to perform initial demonstration flights. 

On 16 April 2021, NASA selected only Starship HLS for crewed lunar lander development plus two lunar demonstration flights one uncrewed and one crewed no earlier than 2024. Two NASA Artemis astronauts are to land on the first crewed Starship HLS landing. NASA had previously stated that it preferred to fund development of multiple Human Landing System proposals with dissimilar capabilities; however, "only one design was selected for an initial uncrewed demonstration and the first crewed landing, due to significant budget constraints" for the human landing system program imposed by US Congress. NASA stated that the unselected proposals Dynetics HLS and Blue Origin ILV as well as landers from other companies would be eligible for later lunar landing contracts.

On 26 April 2021, Blue Origin and Dynetics separately protested the award to SpaceX at the US Government Accountability Office (GAO). On 30 July 2021, the GAO rejected the protests and found that "NASA did not violate procurement law" in awarding the contract to SpaceX, who bid a much lower cost and more capable human and cargo lunar landing capability for NASA Artemis. Soon after GAO rejected the appeal, NASA made the initial $300 million contract payment to SpaceX. The protest action delayed NASA from authorizing work on the contract, and thus delayed the start of work by SpaceX for 95 days. 

On 13 August 2021, Blue Origin filed a lawsuit in the US Court of Federal Claims challenging "NASA's unlawful and improper evaluation of proposals". Blue Origin asked the court for an injunction to halt further spending by NASA on the existing contract with SpaceX, and NASA stopped work on the contract on 19 August, after SpaceX had been allowed to work on the NASA-specific parts of Starship HLS for just three weeks since the work had been previously halted in April. Reactions to the lawsuit were negative, with many criticizing Blue Origin for causing unnecessary delays to the Artemis program. On 4 November, the court granted the federal government's motion to dismiss the case, and NASA announced that it would resume work with SpaceX as soon as possible.

"Option B" contract
On 23 March 2022, NASA announced it would be exercising "option B", an option under the initial SpaceX HLS contract that would allow a second-generation Starship HLS design to conduct a demonstration mission after Artemis 3.

The flight will include docking with the Gateway. The Option B HLS will meet NASA's requirements for a "sustainable" HLS. These include the ability to support a crew of four and longer-duration lunar surface stays.

Notes

References 

Artemis program
Cargo spacecraft
Crewed spacecraft
SpaceX Starship
SpaceX spacecraft
VTVL rockets